2013 (MMXIII) was the year of the 400th Anniversary of the founding of the House of Romanov, Russia's Imperial dynasty. At the date of this anniversary, a number of events were organized on the occasion in Russia and Ukraine marking a grand jubilee in their history. The celebration marks the accession of Mikhail Fyodorovich Romanov to the Russian throne on 11 (21) June 1613 beginning a new ruling dynasty of the Romanovs. The rule of dynasty ended with the abdication of Nicholas II in March 1917. The medal is awarded in three classes: gold, silver and bronze.

Events

France
Among the celebrations organized around the world, the Romanov Celebration Gala took place in Paris on 5 October 2013 at the Chateau of Chantilly. The event was hosted by Maria Vladimirovna of Russia, Head of the House of Romanov and was presided by her son and heir Grand Duke George Mikhailovich; held with the participation of some Romanov descendants, foreign Royalty and nobility, international business and cultural elite at one of France's most historical venues with the finest second collection of paintings after the Louvre Museum. The chateau hosted three official Imperial visits of the Russian Emperors.

On the occasion France, which has a long tradition and respect in the Russian history and culture  welcomed the guests coming from the fields of business, media, diplomacy, art and sports from Europe, Ukraine and Russia to spend the exclusive weekend in Paris and live the get-together time paying a tribute to the Romanov and sharing the emotions of the celebration with luxury leading names and VIP celebrities. Deriving from the Russian imperial traditions of splendid balls, masquerades and other entertainment for aristocrats, the event supported images of Russia and Ukraine on the international arena as the countries which take care of their heritage and therefore, future of their nations.

Medal

Recipients
 Maria Vladimirovna of Russia (2013) - Sovereign 
 Grand Duke George Mikhailovich (2013) - Grand Master

Russia

Religious figures
 Rawil Gaynetdin, The Grand Mufti of Russia (28 November 2018)

Diplomacy
 Vladimir Ardalionovich Malygin, Ambassador Extraordinary and Plenipotentiary of the Russian Federation to the Republic of Malta (14 June 2017)

Malta
 Daniel de Petri Testaferrata, Marquis of San Vincenzo Ferreri, President of the Maltese Association of the Sovereign Military Order of Malta (14 June 2017)
 Andrei Mikhailovich Muraviev, Director of the Russian Centre for Science and Culture in Malta (Rossotrudnichestvo) (15 June 2017)
 Archbishop Charles Scicluna, The Roman Catholic Archbishop of Malta (16 June 2017)
 Peter dei Conti Sant Manduca, Mayor of Mdina (16 June 2017)
 Archpriest Dimitrii Netsvetaev, Former Rector of the Church of Our Lady of Damascus (17 June 2017)
 Archpriest George Mifsud Montanaro, Rector of the Church of Our Lady of Damascus (17 June 2017)
 Joseph Cassar, Maltese Diplomat and Former Ambassador of Malta to the Russian Federation. (17 June 2017)
 Joseph Gauci, Maltese Businessman and Philanthropist. (17 June 2017)

Sweden
 Jonas Arnell-Szurkos, Phaleristic Expert

United States
 Archbishop Kyrill Dmitrieff, The Russian Orthodox Archbishop of San Francisco and Western America (14 May 2013)

See also
 Romanov Tercentenary

References

External links
 Voice Of Russia: 400th anniversary of the House of Romanov
 The Institute of Modern Russia (IMR): Columbia University Celebrated 400th Anniversary of the House of Romanov

House of Romanov
2013 in Russia
Anniversaries
June 2013 events in Russia